Nicola Murru (born 16 December 1994) is an Italian professional footballer who plays for Serie A club Sampdoria, as a left-back.

Club career
Born in Cagliari, Murru started his career at hometown's Cagliari. In July 2011 he was promoted to first team squad, and played his first match as a professional on 20 December, coming on as a second-half substitute in a 0–2 home loss against Milan.

Murru appeared in only one further match during the campaign, a 0–0 draw at Fiorentina, also from the bench. In 2012, after Alessandro Agostini's departure to Torino, he acted as a backup to Danilo Avelar. In the following year Murru appeared as first-choice, overtaking Avelar in the pecking order. On 8 October 2013, he renewed his link with the Rossoblù, until 2017.

On 1 July 2017, he joined Sampdoria.

On 17 September 2020, Murru joined Torino on loan with an option to buy.

International career
After appearing with the under-17, under-18 and under-19's, Murru made his debut with the under-21 side on 5 March 2014, in a qualifying match against Northern Ireland.

In June 2017, he was included in the Italy under-21 squad for the 2017 UEFA European Under-21 Championship by manager Luigi Di Biagio, but later had to withdraw from the team due to injury; he was replaced by Giuseppe Pezzella.

Career statistics

References

External links
 
 
 

1994 births
Living people
Footballers from Sardinia
Sportspeople from Cagliari
Association football defenders
Italian footballers
Italy under-21 international footballers
Italy youth international footballers
Cagliari Calcio players
U.C. Sampdoria players
Torino F.C. players
Serie A players
Serie B players